Inoyat Hojieva, mostly known as Farzona is a Tajik poet and writer. She won a  lifetime achievement award.

Life 
She was influenced by Forough Farrokhzad and other Persian poets, such as Firdowsi and Rumi.

Farzona's works are well known throughout Persian-speaking countries. She is known as Forough of Tajikistan. Her frequently playful and witty poetry draws on rich traditions of Persian literature in a rather humorous way. In late 1980, she wrote a poem called "To the Nation that Gave Birth to Ahmad Zohir".

Works 
Farzaneh Khojandi poems, Enitharmon Press and the Poetry Translation Centre, (Sept 2008), translators: Jo Shapcott, Narguess Farzad,

See also

Modern Tajik literature

References

External links 
Farzaneh Khojandi, a brief biography from the Poetry Translation Centre site  (in English)
Farzaneh Khojandi's Flute Player  (in English)
 Farzaneh Khojandi  
  Flute_Player Farzaneh Khojandi 
 R M Chopra, "Eminent Poetesses of Persian" , Iran Society, Kolkata, 2010

Tajik poets
Persian-language poets
Tajikistani women poets
20th-century Tajikistani poets
1960 births
Living people
Persian-language women poets
21st-century Tajikistani poets
People from Khujand
20th-century Tajikistani writers
20th-century Tajikistani women writers
21st-century Tajikistani writers
21st-century Tajikistani women writers